Relations between the Principality of Liechtenstein and the European Union (EU) are shaped heavily by Liechtenstein's participation in the European Economic Area (EEA).

Comparison

Market access
Liechtenstein is the only microstate (not counting Iceland by population) that is part of the EEA. Liechtenstein joined the EEA on 1 May 1995 after becoming a full member of the European Free Trade Association (EFTA) in 1991 (previously, it had participated in EFTA through Switzerland's membership). All EFTA states bar Switzerland are in the EEA, which gives them access to the EU single market. It also obliges Liechtenstein to apply European Union laws considered EEA-relevant. As of June 2016, around 5,000 of 23,000 EU legal acts in total were in force in the EEA. There is some further cooperation with the EU via Switzerland as Liechtenstein is highly integrated with the Swiss economy (including using the Swiss franc).

Schengen
On 28 February 2008, Liechtenstein signed the Schengen Agreement and became part of the Schengen Area on 19 December 2011. Before this, Switzerland shared an open border with Liechtenstein and was already a full Schengen Area member. This open border was not considered a threat to European security because it would be highly difficult to enter Liechtenstein without first landing in or entering a Schengen state. The border with Austria was not open, and it was treated as an external border post by Austria and Liechtenstein, making it necessary to pass through customs and passport control before crossing.

Liechtenstein signed a Schengen association agreement with the European Union on 28 February 2008, and originally planned to join the Schengen Area on 1 November 2009. However, ratification was initially delayed at the behest of Sweden and Germany who felt that Liechtenstein had not done enough to fight tax evasion; the Council of Ministers eventually consented to the ratification of the protocol on 7 March 2011, with the protocol entering into force a month later. Liechtenstein was due to join the Schengen Area by the end of 2011 and did so on 19 December.

Free Movement of Labour

Although a member of the European Economic Area Liechtenstein does not adhere to the free movement of labour unlike every other member of the European Union and EFTA because its small size and relative prosperity mean that it is vulnerable to high immigration.

Other agreements
There are further bilateral agreements between the two parties on matters such as taxation of savings. There are also ongoing talks on combating fraud and exchanging information on tax matters.

Diplomatic relations between Liechtenstein and EU member states

See also
Microstates and the European Union
Switzerland–European Union relations

References

 
Contemplated enlargements of the European Union
Third-country relations of the European Union